Nattakit Fongwitoo, (born 4 January 1993) is a Thai professional footballer who plays as a forward. He played six times for Port F.C. during the 2015 Thai Premier League season.

References

External links
 
 http://player.7mth.com/305860/index.shtml
 https://www.siamsporttalk.com/th/league/player/1260.html

1993 births
Living people
Nattakit Fongwitoo
Association football forwards
Nattakit Fongwitoo
Nattakit Fongwitoo
Nattakit Fongwitoo
Nattakit Fongwitoo